Elachista parvula is a moth of the family Elachistidae. It is found in France, Switzerland, Italy and Bulgaria. However, some sources say it can be found in North Macedonia, Greece, Turkey and Ukraine.

References

parvula
Moths described in 1978
Moths of Europe